Charles Mark Townshend Colville, 5th Viscount Colville of Culross (born 5 September 1959), is a Scottish television producer, director and peer. He was educated at Rugby School and at St Chad's College, Durham.  The son of Mark Colville, 4th Viscount Colville of Culross, he succeeded to his father's title in 2010, and in July 2011 was elected to the House of Lords, where he sits as a crossbencher. He is also the Chief of Clan Colville. 

He used his maiden speech in the House of Lords to outline the downsides of unpaid internships in the media industry.

References

External links
Charles Colville official website

1959 births
Living people
Viscounts in the Peerage of the United Kingdom
British television producers
British television directors
Charles
People educated at Rugby School
Alumni of St Chad's College, Durham
Crossbench hereditary peers

Hereditary peers elected under the House of Lords Act 1999